Ioannis Boubaras was a Greek chieftain of the Macedonian Struggle from Vlasti, West Macedonia, then in the Ottoman Empire.

Biography 
Ioannis Boubaras was born in the end of the 19th century in Vlasti. He participated from the beginning of the Macedonian Struggle, as a rifleman, messenger, guide and liaison of the chieftains of Western Macedonia. He was a member of the National Committee of Blatsi with significant activity. He created his own armed band and cooperated with the officers Georgios Katechakis, Petros Manos and Pavlos Gyparis in various missions in Eordaia, Kastoria and Florina. On 21 April 1905 he participated as a guide of various bands in the Battle of Mouriki and was arrested by the Ottoman Army on the hill Sni. He was transported to Ptolemaida, where he was tortured and mutilated to death.

His bust is today in a park in Ptolemaida.

References

External links 
 e-istoria, Macedonian Struggle

Greek people of the Macedonian Struggle
People from Vlasti
Greek people from the Ottoman Empire
Greek Macedonians